John Manners (27 December 1877–1946) was an English footballer who played in the Football League for West Bromwich Albion and was also manager of Hartlepools United.

References

1877 births
1946 deaths
English footballers
Association football midfielders
English Football League players
West Bromwich Albion F.C. players
Hartlepool United F.C. players
Hartlepool United F.C. managers